Miki is a given name. Notable people with the name include:

Japanese name
Japanese spellings of the given name Miki include: 
美紀 "beautiful chronicle" 
美貴 "beautiful and noble" 
美樹 "beautiful tree" 
美希 "beautiful hope"

Miki can also be written みき (in hiragana), and ミキ (in katakana). Which both have no meaning.

Japanese people with the name given Miki include:
Miki Ando (born 1987), Japanese figure skater
Miki Fujimoto (born 1985), a member of Morning Musume
Miki Fujimura (born 1956), a member of Candies
Miki Fujitani (born Makiko Kanaya 1973), Japanese actress
Miki Furukawa (born 1979), Japanese musician, and former bass guitarist and singer for the Japanese rock band Supercar
Miki Hayasaka, Japanese manga artist
Miki Higashino, Japanese video game music composer
, Japanese long-distance runner
Miki Imai (disambiguation), multiple people
, Japanese voice actress
Miki Ishikawa (born 1991), member of pop group, T-Squad
, Japanese racewalker
, Japanese voice actor
, Japanese freestyle skier
, Japanese biathlete
, Japanese racing driver
Miki Matsubara (1959–2004), a Japanese singer and songwriter
Miki Nagasawa (born 1970), Japanese voice actress
Miki Nakatani (born 1976), Japanese actress and singer
Miki Nakayama (1798–1887), founder of Tenrikyo
Miki Narahashi (born 1960), Japanese voice actress
, Japanese speed skater
, Japanese swimmer
Miki Sasaki (born 1976), Japanese volleyball player
, Japanese male biathlete
, Japanese judoka
, Japanese businessman and politician
, Japanese politician
, Japanese footballer
, Japanese manga artist

Other
Miki Berenyi, former lead singer of Lush
Miki Berkovich (born 1954), Israeli former basketball player
Miki Biasion (born 1958), Italian rally driver
Miki Halika, Israeli swimmer
Miki Howard (born Alicia Michelle Howard), African-American singer and actress
Miki Manojlović (born 1950), Serbian actor
Miki Núñez, Spanish singer, representing Spain in the Eurovision Song Contest 2019 with the song "La venda", known by the mononym Miki
Miki Yeung (born 1985), Cantonese pop singer from Hong Kong

Fictional characters
Miki Aono, a character from Fresh Pretty Cure!
Miki Naoki, a character from Gakkou Gurashi!
Miki (Chrono Cross), a dancer from the Square RPG Chrono Cross
Miki Hoshii, a character from the iDOLM@STER series
Miki Ikeda, a character in the film Battle Royale II: Requiem
Miki Momozono or Goggle Pink, a character from Dai Sentai Goggle V
Miki Kaoru, a character in the anime, "Revolutionary Girl Utena"
Miki Koishikawa, the main character in the anime Marmalade Boy
Miki Kiyora, a character in the manga, Nodame Cantabile
Miki Masaki, a character from Juken Sentai Gekiranger
Miki Saegusa, a character in Godzilla vs. Biollante, Godzilla vs. King Ghidorah, Godzilla vs. Mothra, Godzilla vs. Mechagodzilla II, Godzilla vs. SpaceGodzilla, and Godzilla vs. Destoroyah. 
Miki (Shugo Chara!), a fictional character in the manga series Shugo Chara! by Peach-Pit
Miki Yoshida, the main character in the Original English-language manga Miki Falls
Miki Mei Ling, a character in the film Dangerous Flowers portrayed by Narawan Techaratanapraser
Miki Hatori - a character from the manga Life
Miki Hiiragi - minor character from the anime and manga series Lucky Star who is the mother of the Hiiragi family
Miki Makimura, a character from the Devilman franchise
Miki Sayaka, one of the main characters of Puella Magi Madoka Magica
Miki, a "Sly Girl" in the book Extras, from the series Uglies, by Scott Westerfeld.

 Japanese feminine given names
 Hungarian masculine given names